5,6-Dihydroxycytosine (Isouramil) can be formed from treatment of DNA with osmium tetroxide.

References

DNA
Biochemistry
Pyrimidinediones